Anthony Robert Kushner (born July 16, 1956) is an American author, playwright, and screenwriter. Lauded for his work on stage, he is most known for his seminal work Angels in America, which earned a Pulitzer Prize and a Tony Award. As well as its subsequent acclaimed HBO miniseries of the same name. At the turn of the 21st Century he became known for his numerous film collaborations with Steven Spielberg. He received the National Medal of Arts from President Barack Obama in 2013. Kushner is among the few playwrights in history nominated for an: Emmy, Grammy, Oscar, and Tony Award.

Kushner made his Broadway debut in 1993 with both Angels in America: Millennium Approaches and Angels in America: Perestroika. He received the Pulitzer Prize for Drama and the Tony Award for Best Play. He then adapted the acclaimed 2003 miniseries directed by Mike Nichols for which Kushner received a Primetime Emmy Award for Outstanding Writing for a Limited Series or Movie. 

In 2003 he wrote the lyrics and book to the musical Caroline, or Change which earned Kushner Tony Award nominations for Best Book of a Musical and Best Original Score. The 2021 Broadway revival of Caroline, or Change earned Kushner a nomination for the 2023 Grammy Award for Best Musical Theater Album.

He has collaborated with director Steven Spielberg on the films Munich (2005), Lincoln (2012), West Side Story (2021), and The Fabelmans (2022). His work with Spielberg has earned him four Academy Award nominations, one for Best Picture, two for Best Adapted Screenplay, and one for Best Original Screenplay.

Early life and education 

Kushner was born in Manhattan, the son of Sylvia (née Deutscher), a bassoonist, and William David Kushner, a clarinetist and conductor. His family is Jewish, descended from immigrants from Russia and Poland. Shortly after his birth, Kushner's parents moved to Lake Charles, Louisiana, the seat of Calcasieu Parish where he spent his childhood. During high school Kushner was active in policy debate. In 1974, Kushner moved back to New York to begin his undergraduate college education at Columbia University, where he received a Bachelor of Arts degree in Medieval Studies in 1978. He attended the Tisch School of the Arts at NYU, graduating in 1984. During graduate school, he spent the summers of 1978–1981 directing both early original works (Masque of the Owls and Incidents and Occurrences During the Travels of the Tailor Max) and plays by Shakespeare (A Midsummer Night's Dream and The Tempest) starring the children attending the Governor's Program for Gifted Children (GPGC) in Lake Charles.

Kushner has received several honorary degrees: in 2003 from Columbia College Chicago, in 2006 an honorary doctorate from Brandeis University, in 2008 an honorary Doctor of Letters from SUNY Purchase College, in May 2011 an honorary doctorate from CUNY's John Jay College of Criminal Justice and also an Honorary Doctorate from The New School, and in May 2015, an honorary Doctor of Letters from Ithaca College.

Career 
Kushner's best known work is Angels in America (a play in two parts: Millennium Approaches and Perestroika), a seven-hour epic about the AIDS epidemic in Reagan-era New York, which was later adapted into an HBO miniseries for which Kushner wrote the screenplay. His other plays include Hydriotaphia, Slavs!: Thinking About the Longstanding Problems of Virtue and Happiness, A Bright Room Called Day, Homebody/Kabul, and the book for the musical Caroline, or Change. His new translation of Bertolt Brecht's Mother Courage and Her Children was performed at the Delacorte Theater in the summer of 2006, starring Meryl Streep and directed by George C. Wolfe. Kushner has also adapted Brecht's The Good Person of Szechwan, Corneille's The Illusion, and S. Ansky's play The Dybbuk.

In the early 2000s, Kushner began writing for film. His co-written screenplay Munich was produced and directed by Steven Spielberg in 2005. In January 2006, a documentary feature about Kushner entitled Wrestling with Angels debuted at the Sundance Film Festival. The film was directed by Freida Lee Mock. In April 2011 it was announced that he was working with Spielberg again, writing the screenplay for an adaptation of historian Doris Kearns Goodwin's book Team of Rivals: The Political Genius of Abraham Lincoln. The screenplay for Lincoln would go on to receive multiple awards, in addition to nominations for Best Adapted Screenplay at the Golden Globes and The Oscars.

In a 2015 interview actress/producer Viola Davis revealed she had hired Kushner to write an as yet untitled biopic about the life of Barbara Jordan that she planned to star in.

In 2016, Kushner worked on a screenplay version of August Wilson's play Fences; the resulting film Fences, directed by Denzel Washington, was released in December 2016.

Kushner is famous for frequent revisions and years-long gestations of his plays. Both Angels in America: Perestroika and Homebody/Kabul were significantly revised even after they were first published. Kushner has admitted that the original script version of Angels in America: Perestroika is nearly double the length of the theatrical version. His newest completed work, the play The Intelligent Homosexual's Guide to Capitalism and Socialism with a Key to the Scriptures, began as a novel more than a decade before it finally opened on May 15, 2009.

In 2018, it was announced that Kushner was working on a script of a remake of West Side Story for Spielberg to direct. West Side Story was released in December 2021 to positive reviews and received seven Academy Award nominations including Best Picture.

In 2022, Kushner collaborated again with Spielberg on The Fabelmans, a fictionalized account of Spielberg's childhood. The film premiered at the 2022 Toronto International Film Festival to widespread critical acclaim and won the festival's People's Choice Award. The Fabelmans received seven Academy Award nominations including Best Picture and Best Original Screenplay.

In 2023, with his Grammy Award nomination for Best Musical Theater Album for Caroline, or Change, Kushner became one of the few writers in history nominated for all four major American entertainment awards: the Emmy, Grammy, Oscar, and Tony Awards.

Political views 

Kushner's six-word memoir was "At least I never voted Republican." His criticism of the Israeli government's treatment of Palestinians and the increased religious extremism in Israeli politics and culture has created some controversy with American Jews, including some opposition to his receiving an honorary doctorate at the 2006 commencement of Brandeis University. During the controversy, quotes critical of Zionism and Israel made by Kushner were circulated. Kushner said at the time that his quotes were "grossly mischaracterized". Kushner told the Jewish Advocate in an interview, "All that anybody seems to be reading is a couple of right-wing Web sites taking things deliberately out of context and excluding anything that would complicate the picture by making me seem like a reasonable person, which I basically think I am."

In an interview with the Jewish Independent, Kushner commented, "I want the state of Israel to continue to exist. I've always said that. I've never said anything else. My positions have been lied about and misrepresented in so many ways. People claim that I'm for a one-state solution, which is not true." He later stated that he hopes that "there might be a merging of the two countries because [they're] geographically kind of ridiculous looking on a map", although he acknowledged that political realities make this unlikely in the near future. Kushner has received backlash from family members due to his political views of Israel.

On May 2, 2011, the Board of Trustees of the City University of New York (CUNY), at their monthly public meeting, voted to remove (by tabling to avoid debate) Kushner's name from the list of people invited to receive honorary degrees, based on a statement by trustee Jeffrey S. Wiesenfeld about Kushner's purported statements and beliefs about Zionism and Israel. In response, the CUNY Graduate Center Advocate began a live blog on the "Kushner Crisis" situation, including news coverage and statements of support from faculty and academics. Three days later, CUNY issued a public statement that the Board is independent.

On May 6, three previous honorees stated they intended to return their degrees: Barbara Ehrenreich, Michael Cunningham, and Ellen Schrecker. Wiesenfeld said that if Kushner would renounce his anti-Israel statements in front of the Board, he would be willing to vote for him. The same day, the Board moved to reverse its decision. Kushner accepted the honorary doctorate at the June 3 graduation for the John Jay College of Criminal Justice.

Personal life 
Kushner and his partner, Mark Harris, held a commitment ceremony in April 2003, the first same-sex commitment ceremony to be featured in the Vows column of The New York Times. In summer 2008, Kushner and Harris were legally married at the town hall in Provincetown, Massachusetts.

Harris is an editor of Entertainment Weekly and author of Pictures at a Revolution – Five Movies and the Birth of the New Hollywood, Five Came Back: A Story of Hollywood and the Second World War, and Mike Nichols: A Life.

He is close friends with theatre director Michael Mayer, whom he met while studying at NYU.

List of works

Plays 
 “Incidents and Occurrences During the Travels of the Tailor Max” Lake Charles, Louisiana, Governor’s Program For Gifted Children, 1980.
 The Age of Assassins, New York, Newfoundland Theatre, 1982.
 La Fin de la Baleine: An Opera for the Apocalypse, New York, Ohio Theatre, 1983.
 The Heavenly Theatre, produced at New York University, Tisch School of the Arts, 1984.
 The Umbrella Oracle, Martha's Vineyard, The Yard, Inc..
 Last Gasp at the Cataract, Martha's Vineyard, The Yard, Inc., 1984.
 Yes, Yes, No, No: The Solace-of-Solstice, Apogee/Perigee, Bestial/Celestial Holiday Show, produced in St. Louis, Imaginary Theatre Company, Repertory Theatre of St. Louis, 1985, published in Plays in Process, 1987.
 Stella (adapted from the play by Johann Wolfgang von Goethe), produced in New York City, 1987.
 A Bright Room Called Day, first produced in New York, Theatre 22, April 1985. Published in Plays By Tony Kushner, Broadway Play Publishing Inc.
 In Great Eliza's Golden Time, produced in St. Louis, Missouri, Imaginary Theatre Company, Repertory Theatre of St. Louis, 1986.
 Hydriotaphia, produced in New York City, 1987 (based on the life on Sir Thomas Browne)
 The Illusion (adapted from Pierre Corneille's play L'illusion comique; produced in New York City, 1988, revised version produced in Hartford, CT, 1990), Broadway Play Publishing Inc., 1991.
 In That Day (Lives of the Prophets), New York University, Tisch School of the Arts, 1989.
 (With Ariel Dorfman) Widows (adapted from a book by Ariel Dorfman), produced in Los Angeles, CA, 1991.
 Angels in America: A Gay Fantasia on National Themes, Part One: Millennium Approaches (produced in San Francisco, 1991), Hern, 1992.
 Angels in America: A Gay Fantasia on National Themes, Part Two: Perestroika, produced in New York City, 1992.
 Angels in America: A Gay Fantasia on National Themes (includes both parts), Theatre Communications Group (New York, NY), 1995.
 Slavs!: Thinking About the Longstanding Problems of Virtue and Happiness, Theatre Communications Group, 1995 & acting edition, Broadway Play Publishing Inc.
 Reverse Transcription: Six Playwrights Bury a Seventh, A Ten-Minute Play That's Nearly Twenty Minutes Long, Louisville, Humana Festival of New American Plays, Actors Theatre of Louisville, March 1996.
 A Dybbuk, or Between Two Worlds (adapted from Joachim Neugroschel's translation of the original Yiddish play by S. Ansky; produced in New York City at the Joseph Papp Public Theater, 1997), Theatre Communications Group, 1997.
 The Good Person of Szechuan (adapted from the original play by Bertolt Brecht), Arcade, 1997.
 (With Eric Bogosian and others) Love's Fire: Seven New Plays Inspired by Seven Shakespearean Sonnets, Morrow, 1998.
 Terminating, or Lass Meine Schmerzen Nicht Verloren Sein, or Ambivalence, in Love's Fire, Minneapolis, Guthrie Theater Lab, January 7, 1998; New York: Joseph Papp Public Theater, June 19, 1998.
 Henry Box Brown, or the Mirror of Slavery, performed at the National Theatre, London, 1998.
 Homebody/Kabul, first performed in New York City, December 2001.
 Caroline, or Change (musical), first performed in New York at the Joseph Papp Public Theater, 2002.
 Only We Who Guard The Mystery Shall Be Unhappy, 2003.
 Translation with "liberties"—but purportedly "not an adaptation"—of Bertolt Brecht's Mother Courage and Her Children (2006)
 The Intelligent Homosexual's Guide to Capitalism and Socialism with a Key to the Scriptures Minneapolis, Guthrie Theater, 2009.
 Tiny Kushner, a performance of five shorter plays, premiered at the Guthrie Theater, Minneapolis, 2009

The stage performance rights to most of these plays are licensed by Broadway Play Publishing Inc.

Books 
 A Meditation from Angels in America (1994) Harper, San Francisco, 
 Thinking about the Longstanding Problems of Virtue and Happiness: Essays, a Play, Two Poems, and a Prayer (1995) Theatre Communications Group, New York, NY 
 Howard Cruse (1995) Stuck Rubber Baby, introduction by Kushner, Paradox Press,  New York. 
 David B. Feinberg (1995) Queer and Loathing: Rants and Raves of a Raging AIDS Clone, introduction by Kushner, Penguin, New York. 
 David Wojnarowicz (1996) The Waterfront Journals, edited by Amy Scholder, introduction by Kushner,  Grove, New York. 
 "Three Screeds from Key West: For Larry Kramer," (1997) in We Must Love One Another or Die: The Life and Legacies of Larry Kramer, edited by Lawrence D. Mass, St. Martin's Press, New York, pp. 191–199. 
 Moises Kaufman (1997) Gross Indecency, afterword by Kushner, Vintage, New York, pp. 135–143. 
 Plays by Tony Kushner (New York: Broadway Play Publishing, 1999), . Includes:
 A Bright Room called Day (First published 1994)
 The Illusion, freely adapted from Pierre Corneille's L'Illusion comique
 Slavs!: Thinking About the Longstanding Problems of Virtue and Happiness
 Death & Taxes: Hydrotaphia, and Other Plays, (1998) Theatre Communications Group (New York, NY), . Includes:
 Reverse transcription
 Hydriotaphia: or the Death of Dr. Browne, (adaptation of Hydriotaphia, Urn Burial, a fictitious, imaginary account of Sir Thomas Browne's character not based upon fact)
 G. David Schine in Hell
 Notes on Akiba
 Terminating
 East Coast Ode to Howard Jarvis
 Brundibar, illustrated by Maurice Sendak, Hyperion Books for Children, 2003.
 Peter's Pixie, by Donn Kushner, illustrated by Sylvie Daigneault, introduction by Tony Kushner, Tundra Books, 2003
 The Art of Maurice Sendak: 1980 to the Present, 2003
 Save Your Democratic Citizen Soul!: Rants, Screeds, and Other Public Utterances
 Wrestling with Zion: Progressive Jewish-American Responses to the Israeli-Palestinian Conflict, with Alisa Solomon, Grove, 2003.
 Arthur Miller: Collected Plays 1941-1961, Library of America, 2006 (editor) Arthur Miller: Collected Plays 1964-1982, Library of America, 2012 (editor)
 Arthur Miller: Collected Plays 1987-2004, with Stage and Radio Plays of the 1930s & 40s, Library of America, 2015 (editor)

 Essays 
 "The Secrets of Angels". The New York Times, March 27, 1994, p. H5.
 "The State of the Theatre". Times Literary Supplement, April 28, 1995, p. 14.
 "The Theater of Utopia". Theater, 26 (1995): 9-11.
 "The Art of the Difficult". Civilization, 4 (August/September 1997): 62–67.
 "Notes About Political Theater," Kenyon Review, 19 (Summer/Fall 1997): 19–34.
 "Wings of Desire". Premiere, October 1997: 70.
 "Fo's Last Laugh--I". Nation, November 3, 1997: 4–5.
 "Matthew's Passion". Nation, November 9, 1998
 "A Modest Proposal". American Theatre, January 1998: 20–22, 77–89.
 "A Word to Graduates: Organize!". Nation, July 1, 2002.
 "Only We Who Guard The Mystery Shall Be Unhappy". Nation, March 24, 2003.

 Films 
 Munich, a film by Steven Spielberg (2005) – screenplay (co-written by Eric Roth)
 Lincoln, a film by Steven Spielberg (2012) – screenplay
 Fences, a film by Denzel Washington (2016) – screenplay (uncredited, co-written by August Wilson), co-producer
 West Side Story, a film by Steven Spielberg (2021) – screenplay, executive producer
 The Fabelmans, a film by Steven Spielberg (2022) – screenplay (co-written by Spielberg), producer

 Television 
 Angels in America, a miniseries by Mike Nichols (2003) – teleplay

 Opera 
 La Fin de la Baleine: An Opera for the Apocalypse, (opera) – 1983
 St. Cecilia or The Power of Music, (opera libretto based on Heinrich von Kleist's eighteenth-century story Die heilige Cäcilie oder Die Gewalt der Musik, Eine Legende)
 Brundibar, (an opera in collaboration with Maurice Sendak)

 Director 
 Helen, written by Ellen McLaughlin, produced at the Joseph Papp Public Theater, 2002.

 Interviews 
 Gerard Raymond, "Q & A With Tony Kushner," Theatre Week (December 20–26, 1993): 14–20.
 Mark Marvel, "A Conversation with Tony Kushner," Interview, 24 (February 1994): 84.
 David Savran, "Tony Kushner," in Speaking on Stage: Interviews with Contemporary American Playwrights, edited by Philip C. Kolin and Colby H. Kullman (Tuscaloosa: University of Alabama Press, 1996), pp. 291–313.
 Robert Vorlicky, ed., Tony Kushner in Conversation (Ann Arbor: University of Michigan Press, 1998).
 Victor Wishna, "Tony Kushner," in In Their Company: Portraits of American Playwrights, Photographs by Ken Collins, Interviews by Victor Wishna (New York: Umbrage Editions, 2006).
 Jesse Tisch, "The Perfectionist: An Interview with Tony Kushner," Secular Culture & Ideas  2009.
Christopher Carbone, Q & A With Tony Kushner, L Style G Style, (May/June 2011): 
 Michał Hernes, "Kushner: Polityczna dusza Amerykanów została okaleczona" in Kushner: Polityczna dusza Amerykanów została okaleczona, May 17, 2012.

 Awards and honors 

Kushner has received various accolades including two Tony Awards, a Primetime Emmy Award and nominations for four Academy Awards and a Grammy Award.  He's also received various honors including: 
 1993 Pulitzer Prize for Drama – Angels in America: Millennium Approaches 2002 PEN/Laura Pels International Foundation for Theater Award for a playwright in mid-career
 2008 Steinberg Distinguished Playwright Award
 2011 Puffin/Nation Prize for Creative Citizenship
 2012 St. Louis Literary Award from the Saint Louis University Library Associates
 2013 Elected Member, American Philosophical Society
 2013: The Lincoln Forum's Richard Nelson Current Award of Achievement

See also
 Broadway theatre
 Dramatic license
 LGBT culture in New York City
 List of LGBT people from New York City

 References 

 Further reading 
 Contemporary Literary Criticism, Gale (Detroit), Volume 81, 1994.
 Bloom, Harold, ed., Tony Kushner, New York, Chelsea House, 2005.
 Brask, Anne, ed., "Ride on the Moon", Chicago, Randomhouse, 1990.
 Brask, Per K., ed., Essays on Kushner's Angels, Winnipeg, Blizzard Publishing, 1995.
 Dickinson, Peter. "Travels with Tony Kushner and David Beckham, 2002-2004." Theatre Journal, 57.3 (2005): 429–450.Fisher, James, The Theater of Tony Kushner, London, Routledge, 2002.
Fisher, James. The Theater of Tony Kushner: Living Past Hope. Second edition. New York: Routledge, 2020.
 Fisher, James, ed., Tony Kushner. New Essays on the Art and Politics of His Plays, London, McFarland & Company, 2006.
 Geis, Deborah R., and Steven F. Kruger, Approaching the Millennium: Essays on Angels in America, University of Michigan Press, 1997.
 Klüßendorf, Ricarda, "The Great Work Begins". Tony Kushner's Theater for Change in America, Trier, WVT, 2007.
 Lioi, Anthony, "The Great Work Begins: Theater as Theurgy in Angels in America", in CrossCurrents, Fall 2004, Vol. 54, No 3
 Solty, Ingar, "Tony Kushners amerikanischer Engel der Geschichte", in Das Argument 265, 2/2006, pp. 209–24 
 Wolfe, Graham, "Tony Kushner's The Illusion and Comedy's 'Traversal of the Fantasy'." Journal of Dramatic Theory and Criticism 26.1 (2011): 45–64. * 

 External links 
 
 
 
 
 
 
 
 
 
 

Interviews
 
 Writing the Playwright, interview by Frederic Tuten, Guernicamag.com, June 2005
Interview with Tony Kushner, Craig Young, AfterElton.com, October 12, 2006
 Of angels and agnostics, Steve Dow, SteveDow.com.au'', undated
 

1956 births
20th-century American dramatists and playwrights
American health activists
American male dramatists and playwrights
21st-century American dramatists and playwrights
Columbia College (New York) alumni
American gay writers
HIV/AIDS activists
Golden Globe Award-winning producers
Jewish activists
Jewish American dramatists and playwrights
Jewish theatre directors
Jews and Judaism in Louisiana
Juilliard School faculty
Lambda Literary Award for Drama winners
American LGBT dramatists and playwrights
LGBT Jews
LGBT people from New York (state)
Living people
Members of the American Academy of Arts and Letters
Primetime Emmy Award winners
Princess Grace Awards winners
Pulitzer Prize for Drama winners
Tisch School of the Arts alumni
Tony Award winners
United States National Medal of Arts recipients
Writers from Lake Charles, Louisiana
Educators from New York City
Educators from Louisiana
Writers from Manhattan
20th-century American male writers
21st-century American male writers